Brandon Taylor may refer to:

Brandon Taylor (American football)
Brandon Taylor (basketball)
Brandon Taylor (footballer)
Brandon Taylor (writer)